The Islamic Da'wah Mosque of Guatemala is a mosque in Guatemala City, Guatemala. It is operated by the Dawah denomination of Islam.

The mosque is located at 4ta. calle 7-77 in Zone 9 of the city.

The mosque is available for the five daily prayers and offers classes in Islamic studies.

See also
  List of mosques in the Americas
  Lists of mosques

References

External links
 Islamicfinder.org

Buildings and structures in Guatemala City
Mosques in Guatemala